Robert Osborne (1932–2017) was an American film historian, TV presenter, and actor.

Robert Osborne may also refer to:

R. Travis Osborne (1913–2013), American psychologist
Bobby Osborne (born 1931), bluegrass musician
Robert Osborne (basketball) in Canada men's national basketball team
Robert Osborne (Victoria cricketer) (1881–1927), Australian cricketer, played cricket for Victoria, 1904–05
Robert Osborne (New South Wales cricketer) (1897–1975), Australian cricketer, played cricket for  New South Wales, 1924–27
Robert M. Osborne (1852–1931), newspaper editor and proprietor in South Australia

See also
Robert Osborn (disambiguation)
Robert Osborne-Smith (1908–1972), cricketer